Ints is a Latvian masculine given name. It is a short form of Indriķis, the Latvian form of Henry, and may refer to:
 Ints Cālītis  (born 1931), Latvian politician and former political prisoner
 Ints Dālderis (born 1971), Latvian clarinetist and politician, Minister of Culture of Latvia
 Ints Ķuzis (borh 1962), Latvian policeman, police general and former commander in-chief of Latvian Police
 Ints Teterovskis (born 1972), Latvian conductor

Latvian masculine given names